A six-issue referendum was held in Cambodia on 3 October 1945. The questions included whether the country should become independent, and whether the presence of foreign military forces should be refused. There were no "no" votes to any of the questions, although two had one or two invalid votes. Voter turnout was 80.3%.

Background
On 10 August Son Ngoc Thanh replaced Prime Minister Ung Hy from power, and held a referendum to try and legitimise his government.

Conduct
It is not clear whether the referendum was held by voters putting a ballot paper in a box. Thanh sent a list of five questions to provincial governors for them to ask voters. The question on independence was worded:

Results

References

Referendums in Cambodia
1945 in Cambodia
1945 referendums
Cambodia